Apoplexy is rupture of an internal organ and the accompanying symptoms. The term formerly referred to what is now called a stroke.  Nowadays, health care professionals do not use the term, but instead specify the anatomic location of the bleeding, such as cerebral, ovarian or pituitary.

Informally or metaphorically, the term apoplexy is associated with being furious, especially as "apoplectic".

Historical meaning
From the late 14th to the late 19th century, apoplexy referred to any sudden death that began with a sudden loss of consciousness, especially one in which the victim died within a matter of seconds after losing consciousness. The word apoplexy was sometimes used to refer to the symptom of sudden loss of consciousness immediately preceding death. Ruptured aortic aneurysms, and even heart attacks and strokes were referred to as apoplexy in the past, because before the advent of medical science, there was limited ability to differentiate abnormal conditions and diseased states.  Although physiology as a medical field dates back at least to the time of Hippocrates, until the late 19th century physicians often had inadequate or inaccurate understandings of many of the human body's normal functions and abnormal presentations. Hence, identifying a specific cause of a symptom or of death often proved difficult or impossible.

Hemorrhage
Because the term by itself is now ambiguous, it is often coupled with a descriptive adjective to indicate the site of bleeding. For example, bleeding within the pituitary gland is called pituitary apoplexy, and bleeding within the adrenal glands can be called adrenal apoplexy.

Apoplexy also includes hemorrhaging with the gland and accompanying neurological problems such as confusion, headache, and impairment of consciousness.

See also
 Transient ischemic attack

References

External links
 
 

Pathology
Causes of death
Bleeding
Obsolete medical terms

es:Apoplejía
it:Apoplessia